Renzo Contratto is an Italian sports agent and former professional footballer who played as a defender.

In 2014, he was inducted into ACF Fiorentina Hall of Fame.

Career
In his  youth, Contratto played for Barcanova, before starting his professional career in Mantova, Alessandria, and Pisa.

In 1980, he was bought by Fiorentina, where he debuted in Serie A on 14 September. After 285 appearances in 8 years, he moved to Atalanta, where he debuted in a European competition, playing the 1989–90 and the 1990–91 UEFA Cup.

At international level, he played six times for Italy national under-21 football team.

After retirement, he became a sports agent.

Honours

Individual 
ACF Fiorentina Hall of Fame: 2012

References

External links
 Renzo Contratto at ATF-Firenze.it
 
 

Italian footballers
1959 births
Living people
ACF Fiorentina players
U.S. Alessandria Calcio 1912 players
Atalanta B.C. players
Udinese Calcio players
Association football defenders